Irene Aloisi (May 20, 1925 – January 1, 1980) born in Milan, Lombardy, Italy, was an Italian actress.

Biography
Aloisi debuted under the show name of Alian and joined a theatre company with Ruggero Ruggeri. She performed in theatre, on television, and over the radio, including many radio dramas for the Rai di Torino station.

Career

Aloisi's acting career spanned four decades, beginning in theatre in the mid-1940s to the late 1970s. On stage she performed at the Teatro Alessandro Bonci in Cesena in 1959/1960 and in Milan under the direction of Carlo Terrón in 1963.  She appeared in television films such as Orgoglio e pregiudizio (1957) directed by Daniele D'Anza, La cittadella (1964) directed by Anton Giulio Majano, and the series Vivere insieme directed by Antonio De Gregorio and Giuliana Berlinguer.

References

Bibliography
 Enrico Lancia, Roberto Poppi, Dizionario del cinema italiano: Le attrici, Gremese Editore, Rome, 2003, p. 11

External links
 

20th-century Italian actresses
1925 births
1980 deaths
Italian radio actresses
Italian theatre people